The 50th Dan Kolov & Nikola Petrov Tournament,  was a sport wrestling event held in  Sofia, Bulgaria between 3 and 5 February 2012.

This international tournament includes competition in both men's and women's freestyle wrestling and men's Greco-Roman wrestling. This tournament is held in honor of Dan Kolov who was the first European freestyle wrestling champion from Bulgaria and  European and World Champion Nikola Petroff.

Medal table

Medal overview

Men's freestyle

Greco-Roman

Women's freestyle

Participating nations

References 

2012 in European sport
2012 in sport wrestling
February 2012 sports events in Europe
2012 in Bulgarian sport